Jaime P. Gomez (born August 31, 1965) is an American film and television actor. 

Gomez was born in Los Angeles, California. He is perhaps best known for playing Nash Bridges's partner Inspector Evan Cortez in 100 episodes of the American police procedural television series Nash Bridges.

Gomez has guest-starred in television programs, his first credit being the police procedural series 21 Jump Street. From 1989, he played Sonny DaSilva in the soap opera television series Generations. In the same year he appeared in the film Say Anything...

Partial filmography 
 Say Anything... (1989) - Partier
 Across the Tracks (1991) - Bobby
 L.A. Story (1991) - Tod PA
 Dolly Dearest (1991) - Hector
 American Me (1992) - Eddie
 The Silencer (1992) - Drew
 Philadelphia (1993) - Guy in Library (uncredited)
 Crimson Tide (1995) - Ood Mahoney
 Solo (1996) - Sgt. Lorenzo
 Clockwatchers (1997) - Derrick
 Sticks (2001) - Sargento Sanchez
 Gabriela (2001) - Mike
 Training Day (2001) - Detective Mark
 Devil's Knight (2003) - Richie Cobor
 16 to Life (2009) - Ronald
 Apocalypse According to Doris (2011) - Felix
 I Am Bad (2012) - Dad
 Benjamin Troubles (2015) - Miguel

References

External links 

Rotten Tomatoes profile

1965 births
Living people
People from Los Angeles
Male actors from Los Angeles
American male film actors
American male television actors
American male soap opera actors
20th-century American male actors
21st-century American male actors